The 1947 Ole Miss Rebels football team was an American football team that represented the University of Mississippi as a member of the Southeastern Conference (SEC) during the 1947 college football season. In its first season under head coach Johnny Vaught, the team compiled a 9–2 record (6–1 against SEC opponents), won the SEC championship, was ranked No. 13 in the final AP Poll, and outscored opponents by a total of 269 to 110. The team was invited to the 1948 Delta Bowl where it defeated TCU, 13–9.

Ole Miss featured two All-Americans on its 1947 roster: quarterback and team captain Charlie Conerly and end Barney Poole. Conerly was a consensus first-team All-American, who also finished fourth in the 1947 voting for the Heisman Trophy. Poole received first-team honors from the United Press, American Football Coaches Association, Sporting News, Central Press Association, and Walter Camp Football Foundation.

In addition to Conerly and Poole, two other Ole Miss players received honors on the 1947 All-SEC football team. Tackle Dub Garrett received first-team honors from the AP and UP, and tackle Bill Erickson received second-team honors from the AP.

The team played its home games at Hemingway Stadium in Oxford, Mississippi.

Schedule

Roster

Season summary

Chattanooga
Barney Poole 13 Rec, 95 Yds, TD

References

Ole Miss
Ole Miss Rebels football seasons
Southeastern Conference football champion seasons
Ole Miss Rebels football